The North East Mayoral Combined Authority (NEMCA) is a planned mayoral combined authority area in the North East of England. It will cover the counties of Northumberland and Tyne and Wear, as well as the County Durham council area. It will consist of eight members: the directly-elected Mayor for the North East and an appointed representative from the seven constituent councils of the combined authority area.

It was announced on 28 December 2022 in the North East devolution deal and will be operational from May 2024. It will replace the existing North East Combined Authority and North of Tyne Combined Authority.

History 
The Tyne & Wear County Council was abolished in 1986 alongside other metropolitan county governments. In 2004, a referendum was held in the North East region to establish a devolved assembly, which was rejected by voters.

The North East Combined Authority (NECA) was established in April 2014, including seven councils: Durham, Sunderland, Gateshead, South Tyneside, North Tyneside, Newcastle and Northumberland. A devolution deal was agreed, including the creation of a mayor to be elected in 2017. In September 2016, that deal broke down, as the leaders south of the Tyne were worried about the loss of EU funding, and in 2017 no mayor was elected.

From 2 November 2018, the boundaries of NECA were reduced to Durham, Sunderland, Gateshead and South Tyneside. The remaining areas left to form a mayoral combined authority called the North of Tyne Combined Authority. The division of the Tyneside built up area into two combined authorities was criticised.

In the Levelling Up white paper, the Government announced a larger mayoral combined authority would be created for the region. Durham was to negotiate a separate county deal. On 28 December 2022, Levelling Up Secretary Michael Gove announced a £1.4 billion devolution deal. The deal included the establishment of a unified mayoral combined authority, with a mayor to be elected in 2024. Martin Gannon, leader of Gateshead Council, said local councils were being forced into the deal and that it did not represent levelling up; he said he agreed with its introduction nevertheless.

Geography

Governance 
NEMCA will have eight voting members and two non-voting members:

 the Mayor
 a member for each council
 the Chair of the Business Board
 a representative of the Community and Voluntary sector

The Mayor will provide leadership to the combined authority and chair combined authority meetings. A deputy Mayor will be appointed from among the voting members of the authority and the Mayor may delegate mayoral functions to authority members.

Mayoral functions 
The functions devolved to the Mayor are -

 housing and regeneration
 education, skills and training
 the adult education budget
 the functional power of competence
 housing and planning, including mayoral development areas and corporations, land and acquisition powers
 finance, through council precepts and business rate supplements
 transport, including bus grants and franchising powers

References 

Devolution in the United Kingdom
Combined authorities
North East England
Local government in England